Colonial elections were held in South Australia from 29 March to 30 April 1878. All 46 seats in the South Australian House of Assembly were up for election.

The three years after the 1875 election continued the instability of government. Arthur Blyth was replaced by James Boucaut only two months after the 1875 election. He re-shuffled his ministry in March 1876, but survived
only 73 days before defeat by John Colton. Boucaut returned in 1877, and took the parliament into the 1878 election in April.

Since the inaugural 1857 election, no parties or solid groupings had been formed, which resulted in frequent changes of the Premier. If for any reason the incumbent Premier of South Australia lost sufficient support through a successful motion of no confidence at any time on the floor of the house, he would tender his resignation to the Governor of South Australia, which would result in another member deemed to have the support of the House of Assembly being sworn in by the Governor as the next Premier.

Informal groupings began and increased government stability occurred from the 1887 election. The United Labor Party would be formed in 1891, while the National Defence League would be formed later in the same year.

See also
Premier of South Australia

Notes

References
History of South Australian elections 1857-2006, volume 1: ECSA
Statistical Record of the Legislature 1836-2007: SA Parliament

Elections in South Australia
1878 elections in Australia
1870s in South Australia
April 1878 events